Yenakiieve (Yenákiieve, ; , Yenákiyevo) is a city in the Donetsk Oblast (province) of eastern Ukraine. It is incorporated as a city of oblast significance (a special status within the region equal to that of a raion (district)).

Yenakiieve is an important regional centre of coal mining, metallurgy, chemical production and manufacturing. The city's outdated industry has caused accidents like that of a gas explosion which occurred in June 2008 at one of Yenakiieve's coal mines. Yenakiieve was founded in 1898 when numerous workers' settlements around the Peter's Iron and Steel Works were united into a single settlement named after . Its first coal mines dated from 1883. The settlement was incorporated as a city in 1925. By 1958, the city and factories had expanded significantly and overtook the outlying villages of Simyukuo, Yevrah, and Tsiminyenny, all of which were resettled in their entirety when local livestock could not survive the expanding steel mills' runoff and pollution. One of the oldest metallurgical factories of Ukraine—the Yenakiieve Iron and Steel Works—operates in Yenakiieve.

The city is known as the birthplace of the former President of Ukraine, Viktor Yanukovych (in office 2010–2014).

History
Permanent settlements on the territory of present-day Yenakiieve were founded in 1783. In 1858 the Sofiyevsky coal mine opened there. At the same time the Petrovsky cast-iron plant was built, today known as the Yenakiyeve Iron and Steel Works. In 1895 engineers F. Yenakiev and B. Yalovetsky and several Belgian businessmen founded a Russian-Belgian metallurgic company which by 1897 constructed the new Petrovsky cast-iron plant around Fyodorovka. Coal mines were opened around the plant. Settlements were formed near them and in 1898 they were united into one called Enakievsky after the founder of the Russian-Belgian metallurgic society. The writer A. I. Kuprin, who worked at the plant in 1896, described workers’ lives in the story “Molokh”. Before World War I several plants were built in Yenakiieve: coke chemical, brick, beer brewing and butter making. The Petrovsky plant became one of the largest metallurgic plants (3rd place) in southern Russia. In 1913 it produced 349,200 tons of cast-iron and 316,400 tons of steel. As a result of ruin after World War I and the Civil War of 1919–1921 Petrovsky plant was the only one producing steel. By 1925 the population in Yenakiieve was 34,000, and it was referred to as a town.

In 1928 the town was renamed into Rykovo, after Soviet party- and statesman Alexei Rykov. After Rykov was arrested in 1937 the town was renamed Ordzhonikidze after another Soviet leader, Sergo Ordzhonikidze. The name Yenakiieve was returned to the town in 1943. By 1939 the population of the town was 88,200.

During World War II Yenakiieve was under siege from Italian army auxiliary units that were seconded to the German Army. They were followed by German units. The city was attacked from 31 October 1941 and not freed until 3 September 1943. Street fighting was fierce between the end of November and beginning of December 1941. “Recruitment” of civilians as Ostarbeiter began in December 1941. In 1950 about twelve Italian POWs (prisoners of war) were put on trial, over atrocities in Yenakiieve including the destruction of a hospital. Apparently no convictions were registered, and by 1954 all Italian POWs were returned to Italy.

In the 1950s several plants were put into operation: of ferro-concrete items, of construction material, of house building and automobile-repair. On September 16, 1979, on the territory of Yenakiieve in the mine “Yuny Communar” there was one of the Nuclear Explosions for the National Economy—an object “Klivazh”. In 2002 the mine was closed as non-perspective and environmentalists worried about the danger of filling the mine with water. It might cause radioactive pollution of the underground water, so pumps continue to pump water out of the abandoned mine.

During the War in Donbas the city was captured by pro-Russian separatists when on 13 April 2014 pro-Russian activists captured its town hall and declared that the city was part of the separatist Donetsk People's Republic.

Demographics 
At the time of the 2001 Ukrainian Census, the population of Yenakiieve was 104,000. Its composition was as follows:

Ethnicity
 Russians: 51.4%
 Ukrainians: 45.3%
 Belarusians: 1.1%
 Armenians: 0.4%

 Language
 Russian: 89.4%
 Ukrainian: 9.8%
 Armenian: 0.2%
 Belarusian: 0.1%

Yenakiieve City Municipality
 Yunokomunarivsk city municipality
 City of Yunokomunarivsk
 Town of Druzhne
 Karlo-Marksove town municipality
 Town of Karlo-Marksove
 Village of Novoselivka
 Settlement of Staropetrivske
 Korsun town municipality
 Town of Korsun
 Village of Verkhnya Krynka
 Village of Petrivske
 Village of Puteprovid
 Village of Shevchenko
 Settlement of Shchebenka
 Village of Avilovka
 Village of Shaposhnykove

References

External links

 

 
Cities in Donetsk Oblast
Populated places established in 1898
Cities of regional significance in Ukraine
Populated places established in the Russian Empire
Bakhmutsky Uyezd
Viktor Yanukovych
Horlivka Raion